Catopta cashmirensis is a moth in the family Cossidae. It is found in Kashmir, the north-western Himalayas in India, Nepal, Bhutan and China (Tibet, northern Yunnan).

References

Natural History Museum Lepidoptera generic names catalog

Catoptinae
Moths described in 1879